Paul Williams "Tommy" Thompson (19 December 1906 in Alliance, Nebraska – 9 February 1996 in Daytona Beach, Florida) was an American Colonel in the United States Army during World War II at the time of the Normandy Invasion. A member of the Class of 1929 at West Point, he also was a recipient of the Distinguished Service Cross which was awarded for having distinguished himself by extraordinary heroism against an armed enemy in circumstances which do not justify the award of the Medal of Honor.  Badly wounded late in the day on 6 June 1944, after recovery he was promoted to brigadier general and became the Information and Education officer of the Communications Zone, the logistics arm of the U. S. Army in the ETO.  He became the officer responsible for the publication of the Stars and Stripes and other G.I. periodicals, the many Unit Histories published for the men and women who served in them, and the re-education of large numbers of soldiers either headed home, or seeking reassignment in the Pacific Theater prior to the capitulation of Japan.

Retiring from the Army as a brigadier general in 1946, he was hired by Reader's Digest, and rose to global business manager, at which point he insisted owner DeWitt Wallace institute a rule of mandatory retirement for executives at age 65, but later proved reluctant when Wallace in turn insisted that Thompson himself comply with this rule.

Awards
Distinguished Service Cross in 1944 as Colonel in the 6th Engineer Special Brigade
Commander of the Legion of Honour
Croix de Guerre (1939–1945)  with palms

References

People from Alliance, Nebraska
1906 births
1996 deaths
Recipients of the Croix de Guerre 1939–1945 (France)
Commandeurs of the Légion d'honneur
United States Army colonels
United States Army personnel of World War II